The Elsworth Snowden House was a historic house located at 504 West 3rd Street in Vermont, Illinois. The house was built in 1908 for farmers Elsworth and Susan Snowden. Contractor Fred Rankin built the house, which has a vernacular Cross Plan. The Cross Plan is typified by a cross-shaped floor plan with a complex roof form; this was exhibited in the house's cross-gabled main roof with a hipped roof over the front entrance and a shed roof over the porch. The house also features decorative elements such as its egg-and-dart molding and glass panels above the entrance and Queen Anne-inspired fish scale shingles.

The house was added to the National Register of Historic Places on November 7, 1996. It is no longer standing at its listed address.

References

Houses on the National Register of Historic Places in Illinois
National Register of Historic Places in Fulton County, Illinois
Queen Anne architecture in Illinois
Houses completed in 1908
1908 establishments in Illinois
Vermont, Illinois